Red Bud is a city in Randolph County, Illinois, in the United States. The population was 3,804 at the 2020 census.

It is the home of the Red Bud campus of Southwestern Illinois College.

Geography

Red Bud lies in the northwestern part of Randolph County and is bounded on the north and west by Monroe County, on the east by the Kaskaskia River, and on the south by Ruma and Horse creeks. Originally it was two-thirds rich rolling prairie, with good timber bordering the Kaskaskia.

History
The city receives its name from the redbud tree, a species of flora that grows in the area. The first development by a European settler within what is now the city limits was made by Preston Brickey in 1820. He constructed a log cabin near the current intersection of Main and Power streets, and there cultivated a farm. In 1839, James Pollock placed a small stock of goods in the log cabin built by Henry Simmons, where he did business for about a year. This was located where Lutheran cemetery now exists. The next year he moved his stock of goods into a log building erected by John C. Crozier. He continued the business there about three years, when he moved to Preston. In 1840, R.D. Dufree became the first permanent merchant in Red Bud. Two years later he built a frame store house on the southeast corner of Main and Market streets. The first brick school house was erected in 1854, in the east part of town.

Incorporation and charter
The village of Red Bud was organized on April 19, 1866, with officers as follows: John Brickey – president of board, Gerhard Boekhoff, William Schuck, Gerhard Ortgeisen, and John Brunner. B.C.F. Janssen was appointed clerk, John Washbaugh constable, and Boekhoff treasurer.

Red Bud was chartered as a city on February 28, 1867. In April the city officer elections were held and came out as follows: Mayor- Jacob Miller; Aldermen- Alexander Green, Henry Fohrell, John Gerner, Peter Kardell, Benedict Rau, and Frederick Roepke. City Treasurer was George Carl, City Attorney was Joseph Simpson, Police Magistrate was John Stoehr, Clerk was Fred Guker, and City Marshal was J. Matt Smith.

Demographics

As of the census of 2000, there were 3,422 people, 4,370 households, and 935 families residing in the city. The racial makeup of the city was 98.71% White, 0.32% Asian, 0.09% from other races, and 0.88% from two or more races. Hispanic or Latino of any race were 0.88% of the population.

There were 1,370 households, out of which 31.5% had children under the age of 18 living with them, 55.0% were married couples living together, 10.2% had a female householder with no husband present, and 31.7% were non-families. 28.4% of all households were made up of individuals, and 16.4% had someone living alone who was 65 years of age or older. The average household size was 2.40 and the average family size was 2.95.

In the city, the population was spread out, with 23.2% under the age of 18, 8.1% from 18 to 24, 25.9% from 25 to 44, 23.0% from 45 to 64, and 19.9% who were 65 years of age or older. The median age was 40 years. For every 100 females, there were 86.4 males. For every 100 females age 18 and over, there were 81.8 males.

The median income for a household in the city was $40,300, and the median income for a family was $50,280. Males had a median income of $36,049 versus $20,957 for females. The per capita income for the city was $19,967. About 6.0% of families and 9.4% of the population were below the poverty line, including 10.1% of those under age 18 and 13.0% of those age 65 or over.

Notable people
Conrad F. Becker, Illinois State Treasurer and Mayor of Red Bud, was born in Red Bud.
James Birchler, Member of National Academy of Sciences.

References

Combined History of Randolph, Monroe, and Perry Counties, Illinois. (1883). Philadelphia: J. L. McDonough & Co.
"Deer Fest."" North County News [Red Bud, Illinois] November 5, 2009: page 1B
"Holiday Happenings." North County News [Red Bud, Illinois] November 12, 2009: page 1B
http://www.redbudchamber.com/festivals/deerfest: Retrieved on 2009-11-29.

External links
 The Randolph County Herald Tribune - Local newspaper
 Red Bud Musketeers Football
 Contemporaneous newspaper account of 1892 tornado

Cities in Illinois
Cities in Randolph County, Illinois
Populated places established in 1820
1820 establishments in Illinois